Roger Maxwell Chapman (born 8 April 1942 in Leicester), also known as Chappo, is an English rock vocalist. He is best known as a member of the progressive rock band Family, which he joined along with Charlie Whitney, in 1966 and also the rock, R&B band Streetwalkers formed in 1974. His idiosyncratic brand of showmanship when performing and vocal vibrato led him to become a cult figure on the British rock scene. Chapman is claimed to have said that he was trying to sing like both Little Richard and his idol Ray Charles. Since the early 1980s he has spent much of his time in Germany and has made occasional appearances there and elsewhere.

In Germany, he was awarded an Artist of the Year award during the 1980s, followed by a Lifetime Achievement Award in 2004.

History 
Chapman was originally the vocalist for Farinas, who released the single "You'd Better Stop" b/w "I Like It Like That" in August 1964. (However, lead vocals on that single were performed by Jim King.) He moved on to join The Roaring Sixties who were renamed Family in 1966. In 1967 the first single was released, "Scene Through The Eye of a Lens", something of a psychedelic classic. Chapman wrote most of Family's songs with Charlie Whitney and their debut album Music in a Doll's House was released in 1968. Their bluesy, experimental rock music gained them a reputation as a progressive underground band.

The release of Family Entertainment (1969), A Song for Me (1970) and Anyway (1970) established Family as a fast and loud rock band also capable of producing the most intense acoustic music, in the British underground music scene, at that time. Their single "The Weaver's Answer" from the Family Entertainment album was a hit in 1969. On 28 August 1970 they appeared at the third Isle of Wight Festival. Although the band was popular in UK and Europe, success in the US eluded them and in 1973 they broke up.

Chapman formed Chapman-Whitney with Whitney, late in 1973. They signed to the Vertigo label and recorded an album Chapman Whitney Streetwalkers (1974), with a line-up including other members of Family and King Crimson, as well as Nicko McBrain, now with Iron Maiden. Chapman and Whitney morphed their band into Streetwalkers, who were a polished album-oriented rock band who used more white soul than Family had. They released Downtown Flyers (1975), moving on to record the groove heavy album Red Card (1976) which was released in the UK in 1976 and remains a much respected album by music fans and the music press. Two more albums followed before the band broke up in 1977, ending eleven years of the Whitney-Chapman musical partnership.

In 1979 Chapman began a solo career and recorded his first solo album Chappo. His backing band became known as The Shortlist at this time and he toured Europe extensively. Mike Oldfield's song "Shadow on the Wall" from the album Crises (1983) featured Chapman on vocals and became a hit. He appeared as a guest artist on the second Box of Frogs album Strange Land (1986) singing lead vocals on two songs. Chapman went on to record Walking the Cat (1989) and Hybrid and Low Down (1990).

Since then Chapman has released eleven albums of new and live recordings. His album Hide Go Seek (2009) was produced by former Family bassist Jim Cregan and released during May 2009. His appearance on Saturday 21 August 2010 at the Rhythm Festival was billed as: "The farewell performance from Roger Chapman & The Shortlist".

Discography

Family

Streetwalkers

Albums
 Streetwalkers Reprise K 54017 (1974)
 Downtown Flyers Vertigo 6360 123, Mercury LP SRM-1-1060 (US) (1975)
 Red Card Vertigo 9102 010, Mercury SMR-1-1083 (US), Repertoire REP 47-WP (CD) (1976)
 Vicious But Fair Vertigo 9102 012, Mercury LP SRM-1-1135 (US) (1977)
 Streetwalkers Live Vertigo 6641-703 (1977)
 Best of Streetwalkers CD, CA, LP Vertigo 846-661 (1990)
 BBC Radio One Live  CD Windsong (1995)

Singles
"Roxianna" b/w "The Crack" Reprise K 14357 (1974) - released as Chapman Whitney Streetwalkers
"Raingame" b/w "Miller" Vertigo 6059 130 (1975)
"Daddy Rolling Stone" b/w "Hole in Your Pocket" Vertigo 6059 144 (1976)
"Chilli Con Carne" b/w "But You're Beautiful" Vertigo 6059 169 (1977)

Solo

Albums
Chappo (1979)
Live in Hamburg (1979) 
Mail Order Magic (1980)
Hyenas Only Laugh For Fun (1981)
The Riffburglar Album (Funny Cider Sessions) (1982)
He Was... She Was... You Was... We Was... (Double, Live) (1982)
Swag (as the Riffburglars) (1983)
Mango Crazy (1983)
The Shadow Knows (1984)
Zipper (1986)
Techno Prisoners (1987)
Live in Berlin (1989)
Walking The Cat (1989)
Strong Songs – The Best Of ... (1990)
Hybrid and Lowdown (1990)
Kick It Back (UK compilation) (1990)
Under No Obligation (1992)
King of the Shouters (1994)
Kiss My Soul (1996)
A Turn Unstoned? (1998)
Anthology 1979–98 (1998)
In My Own Time (live) (1999)
Rollin' & Tumblin (live) Mystic (2001)
Chappo-The Loft Tapes, Volume 1: Manchester University 10.3.1979  Mystic (2006)
Chappo-The Loft Tapes, Volume 2: Rostock 1983  Mystic (2006 )
Chappo-The Loft Tapes, Volume 3: London Dingwalls 15 April 1996 Mystic (2006)
Chappo-The Loft Tapes, Volume 4: Live at Unca Po's Hamburg 5.3.1982  Mystic (2006)
One More Time For Peace  Mystic (2007)
Hide Go Seek Hypertension Records (2009)
First Cut: Chapman-Whitney Streetwalkers, digital rerelease Mystic Records (2010)
Live at Rockpalast Markthalle Hamburg 1979 (2014)
Live at Grugahalle Essen 1981 (2014)
Maybe the last time (live 2012)
Life In The Pond (2021)

Singles
"Imbecile" (1979) Mike Batt with Roger Chapman. From the album Tarot Suite.
"Shadow on the Wall" (1983) Mike Oldfield with Roger Chapman
"How How How" (1984)

DVDs 
 At Rockpalast Wienerworld (2004)
 Family & Friends Angel Air (2003)

References

External links
 Roger Chapman NME 2009
 Roger Chapman Official Appreciation Society
Interview on the Leicester Bands website
Roger Chapman discography with tracks

Family (band) members
English rock singers
English male singers
1942 births
Living people
People from Leicester
Musicians from Leicestershire
Streetwalkers members